Kapuas Regency is one of the thirteen regencies which divide Central Kalimantan Province, on the island of Kalimantan, Indonesia. It formerly covered a wider area, but on 10 April 2002 two further regencies (Pulang Pisau Regency and Gunung Mas Regency) were cut out of its western districts, and the residual area is now 14,999 km.2 Its population was 329,646 at the 2010 Census and 410,400 at the 2020 Census; the official estimate as at mid 2021 was 416,181. The administrative centre is the town of Kuala Kapuas near the coast, but the largest town is Selat, which includes 8 of the regency's 15 urban kelurahan.

Geography 

The total area of Kapuas Regency is 14,999 square km (9.77% of the area of Central Kalimantan Province), delineated into ebbtide and non-ebbtide areas.  It adjoins Gunung Mas Regency, the Java Sea, Barito Selatan Regency and Kalimantan Selatan Province (Barito Kuala Regency), and Pulang Pisau Regency, to the north, south, east and west, respectively.

The north is marked by hills and mountains up to 500 metres above sea level, while the south is coastal and marshy, ebb-tidal and vulnerable to flooding. Rivers in Kapuas Regency are the Kapuas and Kapuas Murung, 600 and 66.38 km in length, respectively.  There are four canals:  Anjir Serapat (28 km in length;) and Anjir Tamban (25 km), each connecting Kuala Kapuas with Banjarmasin, running through Kalimantan Tengah (for 13–14 km) and Kalimantan Selatan (12–14 km); the Anjir Kalampan (14.5 km), connecting Mandomai, the capital of Kapuas Barat district, with Pulang Pisau Regency; and the Anjir Basarang (24 km), connecting Kuala Kapuas with Pulang Pisau.

Administration 
Kapuas Regency's seventeen districts include 231 villages. In 2009 there were 204 villages (190 rural desa and 14 urban kelurahan).  These were categorised as 44 traditional (swadaya), 61 transitional (swakarya) and 59 development (swasembada) villages, 6 isolated villages/wards (2.94 percent) and 52 poor villages/wards (25.49 percent).  In 2009, there were 190 desa heads, 160 desa secretaries, 950 desa staff, 14 kelurahan heads and 14 kelurahan secretaries.

Administrative Districts 
Kapuas Regency consists of seventeen districts (kecamatan), tabulated below with their areas and population totals from the 2010 Census and from the 2020 Census, together with the official estimates as at mid 2021. The 2020 Census and 2021 estimated figures are rounded to the nearest 100 people. The table also includes the locations of the district administrative centres, number of administrative villages (rural desa and urban kelurahan) in each district, and its postal codes.

Notes: (a) includes the offshore island of Pulau Roko.

Climate
Kapuas Kuala, the seat of the regency, has a tropical rainforest climate (Af) with heavy rainfall in all months except July and August.

Population 
The 2010 census recorded 329,646 people, including 167,937 males (50.98%) and 161,503 females (49.02%). The 2020 Census total rose to 410,400. The 2020 population density was 27.36 people/km2, ranging from a high of 624.66 in Selat to only 5.07 people/km2 in Mandau Talawang.

Demographics 
Religion as of 2018:
Muslim  77.71%
Protestant  12.15%
Hindu  9.35%
Roman Catholic  0.77%
Buddhist  0.01%
Confucian  0.00%

Social 
Education is a development sector given priority by government (1945 Constitution mandate, as stated in article no 31 point 2), with an ultimate aim of improving the quality of human resources in Indonesia. There were 147 kindergartens in the regency, with 390 teachers and 4,181 students in 2009.  In 2010, there were 390 Primary schools (including private schools), with 2,736 teachers and 40,714 students, yielding student:teacher ratio of about 14.88.  There were 86 Junior High schools (state and private), with 1,085 teachers, 9,667 students and 465 classrooms; 25 Senior High schools (state and private), with 636 teachers and 5,886 students.

The region had only 38 doctors in 2010, resulting in a service ratio of 8,669.

References

External links
 Phone Directory in Kapuas Regency
 INFORMASI KAPUAS
 KUALA KAPUAS
 Official Website of Local Government
 General Hospital of Kapuas Regency
 Indonesian Medical Association Branch Kapuas
 Photos about Kapuas 
 Indonesia Redcross Branch Kapuas
 Panorama Kapuas

Regencies of Central Kalimantan